The Surfing Federation of India (SFI) is the national governing body for surfing in India.

Surfing Federation of India, formerly Surfing India Association, was initiated by a group of surfers from Mulki, Karnataka, South India. SFI initiated India's first Surf Camp at Mulki in 2011, which was organized by Bay of Life Surf School, Chennai and oversaw India's first Surf festival at Orissa. SFI organised India's first international Surf and Sup Competition in Kovalam Beach, Trivandrum between May 3–5, 2013. Jonty Rhodes, cricketer and a great surfer was the chief guest at the event.

SFI entered the international surfing scene with recognition by the International Surfing Association (ISA), the world's governing body for surfing.

The state associations are Karnataka Surfing Association (KSA), Orissa Surfing Association (OSA), and Surfing and Water Sports Association of Tamil Nadu (SWAT).

Arun Vasu is the president of SFI since 2020.

See also
 International Surfing Association - International governing body

References

Sports governing bodies in India
Surfing organizations
Water sports in India
Year of establishment missing